The 2010–11 Romanian Hockey League season was the 81st season of the Romanian Hockey League. Six teams participated in the league, and HSC Csikszereda won the championship.

First round

Qualification round

Final round

Playoffs

Semifinals
HSC Csikszereda - CSM Dunărea Galați 10-2, 13-2, 12-4
SCM Braşov - Steaua Rangers 8-2, 3-4 OT, 4-0, 5-2

Final
HSC Csikszereda - SCM Braşov 2-3, 3-4, 7-0, 2-1 OT, 6-1, 6-0

3rd place
Steaua Rangers - CSM Dunărea Galați 7-3, 9-1, 7-3

5th place
Progym Gheorgheni - Sportul Studențesc București 8-1, 8-1, 3-5, 9-0

External links
Season on hockeyarchives.info

Romanian Hockey League seasons
Romanian
Rom